James Brodie may refer to:
 James Brodie (Australian cricketer) (1820–1912), Australian cricketer
 James Brodie (botanist) (1744–1824), Scottish botanist and politician
 James Brodie (Canadian politician), 20th-century Canadian politician
 James Brodie (politician, born 1637) (1637–1708), Scottish politician, Member of Scottish Parliament for Elgin & Forfarshire 
 James Brodie (politician, born 1695) (1695–1720), Scottish politician, Member of British Parliament for Elginshire 
 James Brodie (South African cricketer) (born 1937), South African cricketer
 James William Brodie (1920–2009), New Zealand geologist

See also
 James Brody (1941–2010), American composer
 Lieutenant James Brody, fictional character from seaQuest DSV
 Thenral, built by businessman and civil servant James Brodie (1769–1801)